Desperate Journalist is the debut album by London-based post punk band Desperate Journalist.  It was released on November 3, 2014, on Fierce Panda Records.  It received strongly positive reviews from The Quietus and Drowned in Sound.

Track listing

Personnel
Desperate Journalist
Jo Bevan  – voice
Robert Hardy – guitar
Simon Drowner  – bass
Caroline Helbert  – drums

Production
Austen and Jonny – engineering
Götz-Michael Rieth – mixing

B-sides

from the "Cristina" EP
"Mistakes"
"Kitten"
"Wait"

from "Happening"
"Vengeance"

from "Hesitate"
"Happening (Medium Wave remix)"

References

2014 albums
Desperate Journalist albums
Fierce Panda Records albums